County Tyrone was a constituency represented in the Irish House of Commons until 1800.

Members of Parliament

1613–1801

Notes

References

 Parliamentary Memoirs of Fermanagh and Tyrone, from 1613 to 1885

Constituencies of the Parliament of Ireland (pre-1801)
Historic constituencies in County Tyrone
1800 disestablishments in Ireland
Constituencies disestablished in 1800